Sid Barnes was a key member of Donald Bradman's famous Australian cricket team, which toured England in 1948. The team went undefeated in their 34 matches; this unprecedented feat by a Test side touring England earned them the sobriquet The Invincibles. A right-handed opening batsman, Barnes was part of Bradman's first-choice team and played in four of the five Tests—he missed one match due to injury—partnering the left-handed Arthur Morris.

Barnes ended the first-class matches with 1,354 runs at a batting average of 56.41 including three centuries, placing him fifth in the aggregates and sixth in the averages among the Australians. Barnes found his best form in the Tests, yielding 329 runs at 82.25, ranking him third in the aggregates and second in the averages. He scored half-centuries in both innings of the First Test at Trent Bridge, before compiling a hard-hitting 141 in the second innings of the Second Test at Lord's, helping to set up victory in both matches. In the Third Test, Barnes was injured and hospitalised after being hit in the ribs by a Dick Pollard pull shot. He returned the next day and attempted to bat, but collapsed again and had to be taken back to hospital for an extended stay, missing two weeks of cricket. After missing the Fourth Test, Barnes returned to score his third half-century for the series as Australia completed a 4–0 win with an innings victory in the Fifth Test.

Aside from his run-scoring, Barnes, who was well known for being eccentric, gained fame throughout the season for his fielding at short leg—just a few metres from the batsman—where he took 19 catches for the season. Barnes stood much closer than others who fielded in the position, placing one foot on the edge of the pitch. His extreme proximity prompted questions about the legitimacy of his action and English captain Norman Yardley later admitted Barnes had intimidated his batsmen.

Background
Barnes had been a regular member of the Australian cricket team since World War II and was on his second trip to England after making his Test debut there in 1938 before the war. During the 1946–47 Australian season, which saw England tour for five Tests, the home nation's senior opening batsman Bill Brown was injured. Barnes and debutant Arthur Morris had averaged 73.83 and 71.85 respectively, playing in all five matches.

Barnes went to England in the Australian winter of 1947. In his autobiography, he claimed to have gone as a representative for an alcohol company, although appears to have dealt in commodities that were in short supply due to rationing. Once in England, he was approached by Burnley to play as a professional in Lancashire League cricket, which he did briefly before becoming disinterested and resigning. Barnes returned to Australia for the 1947–48 season, keen to win a place on the 1948 tour to England. He was worried that having played as a professional in the Lancashire League would damage his chance of further Test cricket, as the Australian authorities frowned on those who played professionally in England. There was also concern that, with his wife now living in Scotland, he would breach the Australian Board of Control's rule that wives were not allowed to travel with players, by being in the same overseas country.

Brown, Barnes and Morris shared the opening duties against the visiting Indians; their batting averages were 43.00, 52.25 and 42.66 respectively. With Brown recovered, the Australian selectors dropped Barnes for the first two Tests against the Indians. However, Brown struggled and made only 18 and 11 runs—Australia batted once in both Tests—and was then dropped for Barnes, who made only 12 and 15 in the Third Test. Retained for the Fourth Test, Barnes made 112 in an Australian victory. Morris—whose place was secure—was rested for the Fifth and final Test to give Brown another chance to show that he was worthy of selection. Barnes made 33 while Brown made 99 run out as Australia completed a 4–0 series win. In the end, all three were selected for the England tour, though Barnes had to give assurances about the amount of contact he would have with his wife—still living in Scotland—before he was confirmed. As specialist opening batsmen, the trio were competing for the two opening positions in Bradman's first-choice team.

Barnes brought along half a tonne of baggage on the sea voyage to England, including a lot of food and drink, particularly alcohol, which was scarce due to the war and subject to rationing. There Barnes would sell his goods. During the journey, the players had to sign autographs on 5,000 sheets of paper with the team list. Barnes had a stamp of his signature made, and paid a young boy drinks to deal with the sheets, but he landed himself in trouble with captain Don Bradman and manager Keith Johnson when the boy stamped the sheets erratically, sometimes not adjacent to Barnes's position on the team list.

Early tour
Australia traditionally fielded its strongest possible team in the tour opener, which was customarily against Worcestershire. Barnes opened with Morris, while reserve opener Brown batted out of position in the middle order. The hosts won the toss and batted first, and Barnes took the last two catches as Australia dismissed them for 233. He delivered nine overs with his leg spin and was the most economical Australian bowler, conceding ten runs without taking a wicket. When Australia batted, Barnes made 44 from 104 balls in 99 minutes before being the first batsman to fall at 1/79.N- Australia reached 462 and dismissed the hosts for 212 to complete a victory by an innings and 17 runs. During the second innings, Barnes took his first wicket for the tour, having Laddy Outschoorn caught behind by Don Tallon to spark a collapse that saw the home side lose their last five wickets for 47 runs. Barnes ended with 1/25 and took two catches in the second innings; all four of his catches for the match were from spinners.

Morris was rested for the following match against Leicestershire, so Barnes partnered Brown at the top of the order. The pair put on 46 before Brown fell. Barnes then put on 111 with Bradman for the second wicket before falling for 78 at 2/157 to a leg before wicket (lbw) decision the tourists regarded as a clear error. Unhindered, Australia made 448 and won by an innings. Barnes took two catches in the first innings, both from spinners, and bowled four overs without success in the second innings. The Australians proceeded to play Yorkshire at Bradford, on a damp pitch favourable to slower bowling. Bradman rested himself and Barnes as Australia came closest to losing a match for the whole tour. The tourists were 6/31 in pursuit of 60 for victory—effectively seven wickets down with one injured player—before scraping home to win by four wickets.

Barnes returned for the subsequent fixture against Surrey at The Oval in London, where Australia won the toss and batted first. Barnes attacked immediately, and put on an opening partnership of 136 with Morris, before the latter fell. Bradman and Barnes put on another 207 for the second wicket before Barnes fell for 176. The tourists continued to build on the foundation laid by the top order and were eventually bowled out for 632. Bradman's bowlers dismissed Surrey for 141 and 195 to win by an innings after enforcing the follow on. During the match, Barnes was involved in an oft-recalled incident. After a series of Australian appeals had been turned down in the match against Leicestershire by umpire Alec Skelding, Barnes had remonstrated with him and told him he had problems with his eyesight. Barnes also complained about Skelding adjudging him lbw, saying the ball "wouldn't have hit another set of stumps" and telling the umpire to get a guide dog. A stray dog ran onto the field during the Surrey game. It caused a stoppage in play by evading the players and police for a few minutes. Eventually, Barnes used the ball to bait and trap the dog, which he then  presented to Skelding stating: "You must need a dog. You're blind when you give those decisions [against Leicestershire] not out" and "Now all you want is a white stick". Skelding refused the offer, and after Barnes continued to pressure him into taking the dog, he called for an adjournment and left the playing arena. Barnes later wrote "Strange how I suggested he find himself a canine companion at Leicester ... and then one turned up ... Cricket's a funny game."

Barnes was rested for the following game against Cambridge University, which Australia won by an innings. In the next match against Essex, Barnes returned as Australia elected to bat first and went on to score a world record of 721 first-class runs in one day. Barnes opened with Brown and they laid the platform for the record-breaking total by combining for a stand of 145 before Barnes was out for 79 attempting a late cut. It was Australia's largest opening partnership on the tour to date and lasted 97 minutes. After completing their innings, the tourists proceeded to victory by an innings and 451 runs, their biggest winning margin for the summer. In the first innings, Barnes fielded at point-blank range at silly mid-on when Ray Smith was batting against the bowling of Ernie Toshack. Smith hit one ball past Barnes, narrowly missing his head, but the Australian vowed to continue standing in close proximity. In the next over, Smith drove a full ball from Toshack directly into Barnes's foot, who managed to hide any pain despite the ball having enough momentum to ricochet all the way to the boundary. The subsequent delivery was hit straight at Barnes's torso. Barnes reacted fast enough to get his hands on the ball, but it broke through and hit his chest before rebounding. He was able to grab the ball with one hand and Smith was out; Barnes then told the stunned batsman "I told you you wouldn't drive me away". Later, Barnes's torso and foot had to be attended to. Barnes finished off the match by trapping Peter Smith for 54 in the second innings after Australia enforced the follow on, claiming the last wicket to end a tidy spell of 1/11 from 9.4 overs. Barnes was rested for the following fixture against Oxford University, which resulted in another innings victory.

The following match was against the Marylebone Cricket Club (MCC) at Lord's. The MCC fielded seven players who would represent England in the Tests, and were almost a full strength Test team, while Australia fielded their first-choice team. Bradman chose Barnes and Morris as his preferred opening pair, while Brown continued out of position in the middle order. Barring one change in the bowling department, the same team lined up in the First Test, with the top six batsmen in the same position. For players on both sides, it was a chance to gain a psychological advantage ahead of the Tests. Australia won the toss and batted and Morris fell with the score at 1/11. Barnes added 160 for the next wicket with Bradman before falling for 81 with the score at 2/171. Bradman's men went on to amass 552 and bowled out the hosts for 189 and 205 to win by an innings; Barnes caught John Deighton and Jack Robertson and took 0/15 from four overs. During the match, Barnes again gained attention for placing himself extremely close to the batsman when fielding at short leg, with one foot on the edge of the cut strip. According to retired Australian Test batsman Jack Fingleton, himself a former fielder in the leg trap, "[Barnes’s position] was the closest I have ever seen any fieldsman on the leg side". Bradman had suggested Barnes do so when leading English batsman Len Hutton was playing, in an attempt to distract or intimidate him. Barnes later claimed he was at little risk as Hutton was reluctant to hook Australia's pace bowlers towards him and preferred to duck bowling aimed at his upper body. He said Hutton often talked pessimistically to teammates and that the Australians would benefit if they dampened Hutton's confidence. Although Hutton top-scored in both innings, scoring 52 and 64, Barnes said the batsman's eyes betrayed discomfort. The theatrical Barnes also decided to test the umpire's patience by hovering his foot over the pitch, as though he were about to place it down on the batting surface, which was against the laws of cricket. Umpire Frank Chester, who was also known for his flamboyance and penchant for making himself visible, at one point held up proceedings momentarily when Barnes feigned to put his foot on the surface as the bowler was preparing to deliver the ball.

England and MCC captain Norman Yardley later admitted Barnes's close proximity throughout the season had a psychological effect on his batsmen, although the Australian did miss catches because he was too close to react to the oncoming ball.

The MCC match was followed by a draw against Lancashire at Old Trafford; this was the first time the tourists had failed to win since arriving in England. Barnes made 31 in both innings after the first day was washed out; the match ended in a draw. Barnes was rested in the subsequent match against Nottinghamshire, which saw a second consecutive draw. He returned for the next game against Hampshire, as Australia had another scare. On a drying pitch, the hosts dismissed Australia for 117 in reply to 195; this was the first time the tourists had conceded a first innings lead on the tour. Barnes made 20. Hampshire fell for 103 in their second innings to leave Australia a target of 182, which was reached to seal an eight-wicket win, despite Barnes falling for a duck. The final match before the First Test was against Sussex and Barnes was rested as Australia dismissed the hosts for 86 and replied with 5/549 declared before completing another innings victory.

First Test

Having overcome food poisoning leading up to the match, Barnes was selected for the First Test at Trent Bridge, as were the other two openers in the squad. England elected to bat first, and Australia's fast bowlers reduced the home side to 8/74 before finishing them off for 165 late on the first afternoon. In Australia's reply, Barnes partnered Morris at the top of the order, while Brown played out of position in the middle order. The pair had less than 15 minutes of batting before the scheduled close of play. Barnes made an appeal against the light after the first ball of the innings, which was a wide by Bill Edrich. Barnes walked down the pitch and was reported to have casually muttered to umpire Frank Chester "Eh, the light!", which appeared to shock the official. During the previous Ashes series in Australia in 1946–47, Barnes continuously appealed against the light, forcing cricket authorities to limit the batting team to one appeal, after which only the umpire can call off play, at his own prerogative. Morris and Barnes successfully negotiated the new ball attack of Edrich and Alec Bedser to reach stumps at 17 without loss, with Morris on 10 and Barnes on 6. Despite the appeal against the light, the Australians showed little desire to be watchful against Edrich's bowling, scoring 11 runs from his two overs. However, Barnes had been fortunate, edging both Edrich and Bedser through the slip cordon.

Ideal batting conditions and clear skies greeted the players on the second morning. Barnes batted assuredly, while Morris was hesitant and shuffled around the crease. At one stage, Morris scored only seven runs in 55 minutes. Barnes was involved in some interplay with umpire Chester when the latter stopped a drive from Morris with his foot. Barnes picked the ball off the wicket and handed it to the bowler, prompting Chester to wag his finger in disapproval. Barnes responded by admonishing the umpire for blocking the ball.

Barnes and Morris took the score to 73 before the latter was out for 31 after two hours of batting. Bradman came in and Yardley set a defensive field, employing leg theory to slow the scoring. The hosts’ captain packed the leg side with fielders and ordered Bedser to bowl at leg stump. Barnes reached his half-century after 135 minutes at the crease with a pull for four from Charlie Barnett. The score progressed to 121 before Barnes cut Jim Laker onto the thigh of wicket-keeper Godfrey Evans. The ball bounced away, but the gloveman turned around and took a one-handed diving catch to dismiss Barnes for 62. Umpire Ernest Cooke was unsure of whether Barnes had hit the ball into the ground before Evans took the catch, and consulted with Chester, who had been standing at point on the other side of the field, before ruling the batsman out. Keith Miller came in and was dismissed for a duck without further addition to leave Australia's total at 3/121. Australia went on to reach 509 all out on the third day, yielding a 344-run first innings lead.

With leading paceman Ray Lindwall injured, Australia's bowling stocks were stretched and Barnes was brought on during England's second innings and as the fifth bowler to give the others some time to rest. Barnes delivered five overs and conceded 11 runs. In foggy and misty conditions, Joe Hardstaff junior brought up England's 200 with a firmly-struck hook that almost hit Barnes, who was standing at point-blank range at short leg and could not duck before the ball went past.

England were eventually out for 441 on the final day, leaving Australia a target of 98. Bradman's men progressed quickly at the start of the chase. Barnes took 13 runs from the opening over by Bedser, including three boundaries, whereas Morris again lacked fluency. However, Barnes continued to score quickly, and 24 runs came from the first four overs. The tourists proceeded steadily to 38 from 32 minutes before Morris fell for nine. Bradman came to the crease and fell for a duck after 12 minutes in the middle. This left Australia at 2/48; dark clouds began to close in on the ground, and rain appeared to be a possible saviour for England. However, it never came; Lindsay Hassett joined Barnes and they took the tourists to the target without further loss after 87 minutes of batting. Barnes gave Jack Young an opportunity for a return catch, but the ball was dropped. Barnes tied the scores with a swept boundary and ran off the field with a souvenir stump, believing the match was over. He tossed his souvenir back into the playing arena and returned to the field after noticing the reaction of the amused crowd and realising his mistake; Hassett proceeded to hit the winning run. Barnes ended unbeaten on 64 with 11 boundaries; he scored prolifically with his square cut. The next morning, he perused all the newspapers, expecting to be heavily rebuked by analysts for reckless batting on the final day, but they instead focused on his captain's failure to score.

Between Tests, Barnes played in the match against Northamptonshire, which started the day after Trent Bridge. Barnes made 11 and bowled three wicketless overs as Australia cruised to victory by an innings. In the second match—a drawn fixture against Yorkshire—before the Second Test, Barnes managed only a duck—bowled at the start of the match by a swinging yorker from Ron Aspinall—and six.

Second Test

Australia opted to field an unchanged lineup for the Second Test at Lord's, the home of cricket. Before the match, Barnes wagered £8 at 15/1 on himself to score a century, and trained especially diligently in the lead-up to the Lord's fixture. He was motivated because the Australian Board of Control had given his wife rare permission to attend the match, and the refusal of the authorities at Lord's to allow him to practise there when he was in London a year earlier; Barnes saw a strong personal performance as an ideal response to what he regarded as a snub. On the first morning, Bradman won the toss and elected to bat, and Barnes continued his run of low scores since the First Test. The first over bowled by Bedser to Barnes was watchfully played to complete a maiden. The debutant Alec Coxon opened the bowling with Bedser and removed Barnes for a duck in his second over, caught by Len Hutton at short fine leg. Barnes tried to knock the short delivery through square leg but misjudged the pace of the wicket and played his shot too early, mishitting the ball to Hutton, and leaving Australia at 1/3. They eventually reached 350 and bowled England out for 215 early on the third day.

The weather was fine as Australia started their second innings just after noon. On the second ball of the innings—bowled by Bedser—Barnes got off the mark to avoid his pair. Coxon took the new ball at the other end and Barnes and Morris saw it off. In contrast to their English counterparts, the Australian opening pair began cautiously, avoiding the hook shot and not playing at balls which were not going to hit the stumps, establishing a solid start for themselves. Keen to win his bet, Barnes was particularly determined. He survived a stumping opportunity from Laker when he was 18; he came down the pitch and the ball bounced out of the footmarks past the bat and narrowly missed the leg stump, but Evans fumbled the ball, which went away for four byes, giving Barnes a life. Barnes took advantage of the let-off to combine with Morris for an opening stand of 122, as Yardley made frequent bowling changes in an attempt to disrupt the Australian pair. Morris stopped shuffling, while Barnes adopted a strategy of pre-emptively moving down the pitch to attack the off spin of Laker. Earlier in the tour, Barnes had often been bowled or trapped leg before wicket (lbw) while trying to force off breaks into the leg side from the crease. On this occasion, he drove Laker into the pavilion for six and Australia reached 0/73 at the luncheon adjournment with Barnes on 25, an overall lead of 208.

After lunch, Morris was bowled for 62. Bradman joined Barnes and the Australian skipper played and missed a few times before settling down. Barnes responded to his captain's difficulties by manipulating the strike and shielding Bradman from Bedser. The Australian opener had little trouble against the leg trap Bedser set for him, scoring freely into the leg side and taking the shine off the second new ball. Generally however, Barnes also scored sedately after lunch, and after one extended period of defence, he drove Laker for four through the covers, eliciting a round of ironic applause. Barnes responded to the public gallery by placing his hand on his chest and bowing to the spectators. Barnes had started slowly, but accelerated after reaching his half-century. He reached 96 with Australia at 1/222 half an hour after tea. By this time, the pace of the pitch appeared to have slowed, making batting relatively easy.

Barnes lingered for a further ten minutes on 96 before reaching his century with a straight drive from Laker. He had taken 255 minutes and hit ten fours in reaching triple figures. Having registered his century and fulfilled his bet, Barnes became particularly aggressive. He stepped out of his ground to attack Laker, but missed, as did Evans, who was unable to stop the ball as it spun down the leg side. Barnes dispatched one Laker over for 21 runs, including two consecutive shots over the long on boundary and two fours. Barnes was finally removed for 141, caught on the boundary by Cyril Washbrook from the bowling of Yardley. He struck 14 boundaries and two sixes in his innings and the speed of his batting had allowed Australia to reach 2/296 in 277 minutes after a 174-run partnership with Bradman. Hassett was bowled first ball, so Miller came to the crease at 3/296 to face the hat-trick ball. He survived a loud lbw appeal to deny Yardley his hat-trick; Australia consolidated and eventually declared at 7/460 on the fourth day.

England faced a target of 596, which would have required a world record Test run-chase—no team had successfully chased down more than 400 for victory. Early on, Washbrook pulled Lindwall for a four, almost collecting Barnes in the nose in his customary short leg position. Australia bowled out the hosts for 186 to win by 409 runs and take a 2–0 lead.

The next match was against Surrey and started the day after the Test. After 16 days of cricket in 20 calendar days, Barnes was rested as Australia completed a 10-wicket win. Barnes returned for the following game against Gloucestershire. The tourists elected to bat first and Barnes—playing many square cuts—made 44 in an opening partnership of 102 with Morris, who went on to top-score with 290. Australia reached 7/774 declared, its highest score for the tour, laying the groundwork for a victory by an innings and 363 runs. When Australia was fielding, Barnes was not at his characteristic close-range position, but spent much of the time at third man or fine leg near the edge of the playing arena. At times, Barnes wandered about aimlessly between various positions, but Hassett, captaining in place of the resting Bradman, did not attempt to command him.

Third Test

The teams reassembled at Old Trafford for the Third Test. Australia dropped Brown, who had scored 73 runs at 24.33 in three Test innings in his unfamiliar position in the middle order. Yardley won the toss and elected to bat, and England made 363. Barnes caught his first victim for the Test series, the diminutive debutant opener George Emmett, who was surprised by a rising ball from Ray Lindwall. Emmett took his eyes from the ball and fended with one hand on the horizontally-held bat, while ducking his head down below his arms; the ball bounced slowly off the pitch and after hitting Emmett's bat, rebounded gently up in the air to Barnes, leaving England at 2/28. Barnes dropped two catches later in the day, but neither cost Australia substantially. Jack Crapp hit Ernie Toshack to Barnes at short leg, who failed to hold the catch. However, Crapp did not capitalise and was out soon after. During the same middle session, Yardley hit Toshack to Barnes, who was again unable to complete the reflex catch. However, Yardley was dismissed shortly after for 22. Tail-ender Dick Pollard came to the crease on the second morning and pulled a ball from Ian Johnson into the left ribs of Barnes, who was standing at short leg, almost on the edge of the cut strip. According to Fingleton, Barnes "dropped like a fallen tree", and a minority of spectators loudly celebrated the injury. Briefly paralysed on his left side, he had to be carried from the ground by four policemen and taken to hospital for an examination.

Australia came out to bat halfway through the middle session on the second day, after England had ended on 363. Having dropped Brown, Barnes's injury left Australia with only one specialist opener, Morris. Johnson—a bowler—was deployed as Australia's makeshift second opener and fell for one. On the third morning, Barnes came out to bat upon Keith Miller's dismissal at 4/135, even though he had collapsed from the aftereffects of his injury while practising in the nets. Barnes had refused to stay in hospital and returned to the ground despite his ribs being discoloured from the bruising. Bradman was not aware of Barnes's collapse in the nets, but had told all rounder Sam Loxton to bat before Barnes to give the bruised opener more rest. Loxton told Barnes of Bradman's wishes, but when Miller was dismissed, Barnes defied team orders and walked out to bat, shaking Pollard's hand at the start of his innings.

He made a painful single in 25 minutes of batting before it became too much. The bruising severely restricted his mobility and breathing, and he turned down a single after being called through by Loxton, who had come in at the fall of Morris. Soon after, the pair took a single, and Barnes collapsed after completing the run. Barnes was taken from the ground with the assistance of Bradman among others, and sent back to hospital to recuperate for several days. He took no further part in the match, which ended in a rain-affected draw; Johnson again fell for single figures in the second innings. After the Test, Barnes—still injured—missed the ten-wicket victory over Middlesex at Lord's. The match was Australia's only fixture between Tests.

Fourth Test

The teams headed to Headingley for the Fourth Test, with Barnes still unfit. Australia made two changes for the match. Neil Harvey came in for Barnes, while Ron Saggers replaced Don Tallon—who had a finger injury—behind the stumps. Wisden commented that the England batsmen welcomed the freedom brought by the absence of Barnes from the forward short leg position. Brown was not recalled to open; instead, Hassett was promoted to the top of the order to partner Morris, while the teenager Harvey slotted into the middle-order. Hassett struggled, making 13 and 17, but Australia nevertheless completed a world record Test run-chase of 3/404 to seal the series with a seven-wicket win.

Barnes returned from injury after two and a half weeks on the sidelines immediately after the Fourth Test. He made 24 as Australia amassed 456 and defeated Derbyshire by an innings. He delivered 14 overs in the second innings, taking 0/6, the most economical figures in the match apart from one bowler who bowled a solitary maiden. When Australia fielded, a point of interest for onlookers was where Barnes would field; he stayed at mid-wicket, well clear of the batsman. Barnes made 31 in the next game against Glamorgan, a rain-affected draw that did not reach the second innings. After being given out lbw to Allan Watkins, he walked off visibly showing his displeasure at the umpiring decision, believing the ball would have missed leg stump. The hosts fell for 197 and Australia reached 3/215 when inclement weather ended the match.

Barnes was rested as Bradman's men defeated Warwickshire by nine wickets. He returned as the tourists faced and drew with Lancashire for the second time on tour. Barnes top-scored in the first innings with 67, putting on an opening stand of 123 with Morris as Australia made 321. He continued his productivity with 90 in the second innings, adding 161 for the second-wicket with Bradman. The home side managed to hang on for a draw, seven wickets down in their second innings. Barnes was then rested for the non-first-class match against Durham, a rain-affected draw that did not reach the second innings. Australia made 282 and had the hosts at 5/73 in reply when rain washed out the match after the first day.

Fifth Test

Australia headed south to The Oval for the Fifth Test. Barnes resumed his opening position, while Hassett returned to his customary position in the middle order. England won the toss and elected to bat on a rain-affected pitch. Propelled by Ray Lindwall's 6/20, Australia skittled England for 52 in 42.1 overs on the first afternoon.

In contrast, Australia batted with ease, as the overcast skies cleared and the sun came out. Morris and Barnes passed England's first innings total by themselves, taking less than an hour to push the Australians into the lead. O’Reilly felt the Australian openers wanted to prove "the pitch itself had nothing whatever to do with the English batting debacle". The only chance came when Barnes powerfully square cut Bedser low to point, where Young spilled the catch. When Young came on to bowl, his finger spin was expected to trouble the batsmen on a rain-affected surface, but he delivered little variation in pace and trajectory and Barnes in particular hit him repeatedly through the off side field. Australia reached 100 at 17:30, with Barnes on 52 and Morris on 47. They took the score to 117 before Barnes was caught behind from Eric Hollies for 61, ending a 126-minute stand. Barnes stumbled forward to a fast-turning leg break that caught his outside edge. He had overbalanced and would have been stumped if he had failed to make contact with the ball. Australia finished at 389 on the second day and bowled out the hosts for 188 in the second innings, sealing victory by an innings and 149 runs to complete a 4–0 series win.

Later tour matches
Seven matches remained on Bradman's quest to go through a tour of England undefeated. Barnes was rested as Australia defeated Kent by an innings immediately after the Fifth Test. In the subsequent game against the Gentlemen of England, Barnes made only 19 before Australia declared at 5/610 against a team with eight Test players. Barnes sent down a total of eight overs for figures of 0/28 as Australia went on to complete an innings victory. Barnes made 42 before retiring ill in the next match against Somerset. Having batted first, the tourists went on to declare at 5/560 and won by an innings and 374 runs. In the following match against the South of England, Barnes made a duck. Australia declared at 7/522 and bowled out the hosts for 298 before rain ended the match.

Australia's biggest challenge in the post-Test tour matches was against the Leveson-Gower's XI. During the last Australian campaign in 1938, this team was effectively a full-strength England outfit, but this time Bradman insisted only six current England Test players be allowed to represent the hosts. After his opponents had finalised their selection, Bradman fielded a full-strength team; the only difference from the Fifth Test team was Johnson's inclusion at the expense of Doug Ring. The Australian bowlers skittled the hosts for 177, and Barnes put on 102 with Morris before the latter fell for 62. Bradman joined Barnes and the pair put on 225 for the second wicket. Barnes finished with 151, including 15 fours and 4 sixes, after throwing his wicket away to Laker's bowling, and Australia declared at 8/469. The hosts were 2/75 when the match ended in a draw after multiple rain delays.

The tour ended with two non-first-class matches against Scotland. Barnes made five as Australia scored 236 in the first match. He then bowled nine overs—including seven maidens—and conceded nine runs as Australia won by an innings. Barnes was rested for the second match, which also ended in an innings victory.

Role

Barnes played in four of the five Tests as a right-handed opening batsman, partnering the left-handed Morris, although he batted at No. 6 in the Third Test due to his rib injury. Three opening batsmen were taken on the tour, Brown being the third. During the tour matches, which were usually played consecutively with one or no days between fixtures, Bradman rotated the trio, generally to rest one from the match while the other two opened.N- Notable exceptions occurred in the first two Tests, the opening match against Worcestershire and the warm-up match against the MCC. In those matches, Australia fielded its first-choice team and as a result, Brown played out of position in the middle order while Morris and Barnes opened. An occasional leg spin bowler, Barnes delivered only 65.4 overs during the first-class matches, five of which were in Tests. He took two wickets, both outside the Test arena.

Barnes ended the first-class tour with 1,354 runs at 56.41 including three centuries, placing him fifth in the aggregates and sixth in the averages among the tourists. Barnes's form peaked in the Tests, scoring 329 runs at 82.25; among the Australians he ranked third in the aggregates and second in the averages.

An eccentric and strong-willed character who was not afraid to go against convention, Barnes stationed himself as close to the bat as possible when fielding at either forward short-leg or silly point. The tour report in the 1949 edition of Wisden Cricketers' Almanack judged Barnes's fielding to be as important as his batting in the team's success: 

However, Barnes received criticism for this approach, including from Fingleton, who fielded there during his playing career. A letter was published in English newspapers, questioning Bradman on whether Barnes's position was legitimate—the writer thought Barnes's close proximity yielded an unfair advantage over the batsmen. Bradman later touted Barnes as the best fieldsman he had seen in the position, while England skipper Yardley admitted Barnes had worried the home team's players. Fingleton said that if the position was unfair, then it was the umpires' duty to take action. He further said the batsmen should have tried to deter Barnes from standing so close by aiming shots at him, deeming the Australian to be "of great value in a nuisance capacity throughout the tour". After several near-misses, he was finally hit in the Third Test and missed two weeks of cricket, but he was not injured again after his resumption. Barnes took 19 catches for the season, although only one came in the Tests.

Aftermath 

Barnes used the opportunity of travelling around England to pursue his business interests, cutting many deals. When he was rested from the first match against Yorkshire, he stayed in the capital and made deals at the London Exhibition. During breaks in play, or when Australia was batting and he had already been dismissed, he often spent the time inspecting local factories and talking to other businesspeople. An important concern for Barnes, when returning to Australia by boat after the tour, was to avoid paying customs duties on the enormous amount of goods he acquired through various deals during the tour. This included fine English cloth, which was in very short supply in Australia. Hearing a rumour that customs officers were waiting in Sydney for him, Barnes disembarked at Melbourne and travelled to Sydney by train. The move worked and he sold his stock at a substantial profit, conservatively estimated to be equal to his tour fee. Upon returning to Australia, Barnes opted out of first-class cricket to focus on business interests. He wrote a newspaper column, in which he often criticised cricket administrators and the small share of revenue they gave to players. Barnes wrote in a confrontational manner, often lampooning and angering the authorities.

At the beginning of the 1951–52 season, Barnes returned to the New South Wales team in a bid to regain his Test position, and performed well. He was chosen by the selectors but the board disallowed his selection for conduct reasons rather than ability. The media figured this out and publicised it, and Barnes was overlooked for the whole season. Speculation abounded as to the nature of his supposed misdeeds. These included jumping the turnstile at a ground when he forgot his player's pass, insulting the royal family, theft from team-mates, drunkenness, stealing a car, parking his car in someone else's space, or that Barnes had lampooned the board in the narration accompanying the home movies he made of the 1948 tour. In later years, a file of unknown authorship was found; it accused Barnes of allowing young spectators to enter the playing arena to field the ball instead of doing so himself, and of denigrating umpires by making gestures implying they were blind.

The Board had a secret dossier documenting Barnes's behaviour and they doctored the minutes of the meeting at which they discussed his selection. The matter came to a head when a letter attributed to man named Jacob Raith was published in the paper, criticising Barnes's character, and praising the board, which prompted Barnes to sue with the intention of prising out an explanation for his omission. Cricket administrators were called to testify about the matter and more details became public. According to cricket historian Gideon Haigh, "it was effectively the Board, not Raith, in the dock".

Keith Johnson, the team manager during the 1948 tour, became the centre of attention. He wrote and had always claimed that the touring party had been completely harmonious and loyal. A series of administrators came forward to say Barnes had misbehaved on the 1948 tour, even though Johnson's official report had made no mention of any problems. There were also positive reports. Aubrey Oxlade, the chairman of the board, said the batsman's indiscretions were "childish things" and "not serious at all". Frank Cush, another board member who had supported Barnes's inclusion, replied "none at all" when asked if there were any legitimate reasons for excluding Barnes. Selector Chappie Dwyer said "I have a very high opinion of him as a cricketer ... and I have no objection to him as a man".

Johnson was called as a witness, and under questioning, a different story came out. Johnson agreed that his written report of the 1948 tour had said the team behaved "in a manner befitting worthy representatives of Australia" and that "on and off the field their conduct was exemplary". However, in a verbal report, Johnson said he had drawn the board's attention to various misdemeanours by Barnes during the 1948 tour that, in his opinion, were sufficiently serious to warrant the player's exclusion from future Australian Test sides. Johnson said Barnes had shown a "general reluctance for anything savouring of authority". The misdeeds included taking pictures as the Australian team was presented to the royal family on the playing arena during the Second Test at Lord's, asking permission to travel alone in England—Barnes' family was living in Scotland at the time—and "abducting" twelfth man Toshack to play tennis during the match at Northamptonshire on a court "300 yards from the pavilion". Under cross-examination, Johnson said that Barnes's photography of the royal family at Lord's was the most serious incident. He admitted he had not known that Barnes had received permission to take the photos. Barnes's lawyer then established that his client had then shown the films to raise money for various charities. He further showed that Barnes had not agitated when reminded of the policy against players meeting with family members on tour. However, Johnson believed the cumulative effect of the misdeeds "warranted omission from the team", and he saw no problem in the fact that his verbal advice to the board recommending Barnes' exclusion was at odds with the written report on the 1948 tour. Under cross-examination, Johnson admitted that "I don't always write what I think", and ended up being embarrassed by Barnes's lawyer. The case collapsed on its second day, after Barnes was issued with a public apology regarding the letter. After the libel trial, Johnson resigned from all cricket administration, while Barnes continued to be overlooked. Although the court case portrayed "an awful image of the chaos and bigotry under which Australian cricket was administered", it did little to alter the board's culture towards players.

Notes

Notes on statistics and scoring conventions

n-[1]

This notation means that one wicket was lost while 79 runs were scored.
n-[2]

This statement can be verified by consulting all the scorecards for the matches, as listed here.

General notes

References

 

 

 

The Invincibles (cricket)